is a potentially hazardous asteroid around 200 meters in diameter that was discovered on 25 January 2022 when it was  from Earth. On 29 January 2022 with an observation arc of 22 days it was rated with a Torino scale of 1 for a virtual impactor on 11 July 2061 21:22 UTC. The 2061 virtual impactor was ruled out on 9 February 2022 with a 32.9 day observation arc. Nominal approach is expected to occur 18 June 2061.

Closest approach to Earth in 2022 occurred on 13 March 2022 at a distance of about 7.7 million km. It will come to perihelion (closest approach to the Sun) on 25 April 2022.

References

External links 
 FindOrb 2022 BX1
 
 
 

Minor planet object articles (unnumbered)
Discoveries by MLS
Near-Earth objects removed from the Sentry Risk Table
20220125
20220313